Margaret Root may refer to:

Margaret Cool Root, Professor of Near Eastern Art and Archaeology at the University of Michigan.
Margaret E. Root, married name of Margaret E.B. Simpson (1906–1944), Scottish archaeologist.